Ibiyinka Olufemi Alao (born 17 October, 1975) is an American artist, architect,  writer, film director and musical theater composer. He has focused his career on the fluidity of all art forms in storytelling, using painting as an act of frozen music and self-expression. Along with John Lennon, singer Alicia Keys and 2 other artists, he is noted among 5 Artists Who Have Spread Messages of Peace Around the World by Global Citizen.

Education
Alao attended the Nigerian Navy Secondary School (NNSS) in Navy Town, Lagos. He obtained an A-Levels certificate in Physics at Kwara State Polytechnic and studied Architecture at the Obafemi Awolowo University in Ile-Ife. After graduating with the University degree, he worked as an architect and civil engineer with the State Ministry of Works and Housing Development.

Career
In 2005 he was named Nigeria's "Ambassador of Art" by The President and Commander in Chief of The Armed Forces. Alao won first place in the United Nations International Art Contest  involving participants from 61 countries. On May 18, 2016  Ibi's Fireflies  a story book based on one of his paintings "Eternity in our Hearts" won the Grand Prize of the 2016/2017 Scholastic "Kids are Authors" contest. Ibi's Fireflies was presented by students of Willow Lane Elementary School in Macungie Pennsylvania and also Al Khair school in London. It won the 1st place out of over 900 entries from schools in the United States.

From 2018 to 2020, Ibiyinka worked on a new painting that is considered by experts as an Opus of the artist. Eternity is one of the largest paintings in the world, measuring 100 ft (30.50 meters) wide X 12 ft (3.70 meters) tall. An allegory of the artist's vision in combination with a new musical written by him, it was unveiled at a magnificent art gallery and theater play event in October, 2020.

My FireFlies, a feature animated movie based on this painting was released in 2019. It is scheduled to be shown at some film festivals and art shows in 2021. The book "Ibi's Firefies" is filed as the artist's biography at the Smithsonian National Museum of American Art, while the original painting along with some of his other works are catalogued with copyright by The United States Library of Congress

As an Art Ambassador, the artist is among a select few around the world whose work is used to represent the original 1945 UN Charter of Peace, Food Security, Equality, Freedom, Human Dignity and more by agencies such as the Food and Agriculture Organization of the United Nations(FAO) in Rome, and the UNFPA.

Recent quote by Ibiyinka about his Painting: "I Draw, Paint and Write about whatever I'm able to find, feel and sometimes understand. I feel that it is healthier to look out at the world through a window than through a mirror. Otherwise, all you see is yourself and whatever is behind you." 
He's from  Ponyan in Iyagba East Local Government area of Kogi State. Father is Ezekiel Bamisaiye Alao and mother is Grace Bosede Alao. Two brothers and two sisters.
Ibiyinka's artworks are characterized by bright colors and a sunlight wilderness. They express many themes including hope, joy, peace and love - a reflection of his West African roots and deep faith in Jesus Christ as Lover and Redeemer of our Souls.

Ibiyinka's artworks have been featured by the Nigerian National Museum, the British Council, the Royal Netherlands Embassy, the Metropolitan Museum of Art in New York City, the Smithsonian Museum in Washington DC, The World Bank Headquarters in Washington DC, The headquarters of the United Nations in New York City, the Harvard Business School in Cambridge, Massachusetts, the Empire State Building in New York City and the Martin Luther King Center to name a few. Ibiyinka was invited by the Director General to attend the SEC 25 class, and give a special lecture at the National Institute for Policy and Strategic Studies(NIPSS) where he expounded to the participants about the importance of art in establishing government policies towards peace. He is an honorary member of the National Institute.

James D. Wolfensohn, The Chairman Emeritus of the Carnegie Hall in New York City and Former President of the World Bank Group hosted Ibiyinka's artworks during the exhibit "Visions and Vignettes" - a collection of 18 contemporary colorful Tempera pieces. It was curated by the World Bank Art Program in partnership with the Smithsonian Museum. Three important early pieces of Ibiyinka's work are in the permanent collection of the World Bank.

The Children's Museum of Pittsburgh hosted Ibiyinka as a 2020 inaugural Tough Art at Home Artist in Residence. They produced a video from his studio of Ibi telling a story and teaching children how to paint with light using Chiaroscuro.

Bucknell University hosted Ibiyinka for an art/science residency during the Autumn of 2021 with funding focused on Firefly research from National Science Foundation.

Philosophy
In an interview with Curator Magazine called Our Beautiful Common Humanity, Ibiyinka discussed the necessity of making art accessible to everyone, stating that many big art institutions, especially in the Western world are yet to come to terms with a way of showing art without making it appeal only to the elite, thereby losing its true meaning. Here is a quote from that interview: 

And in an interview with the Metropolitan Museum's Biweekly Newspaper: "Although I am thankful that winning an international art award opened the doors to some of my success as an artist, what you really get with art competitions and awards is favoritism. One can say my favorite painting is this or that, but unfortunately the world interprets it to mean the best painting, and I don't think that kind of judgement is possible with art. It's possible in sports, where you can see someone clearly win a boxing match or track and field event. But with art, judgement is revealed through parameters that are invisible to the eye."

"A Bird of Fire"
The art critic and poet Pascal Letellier of the French Cultural Center observed a special exhibit of Ibiyinka's work presented by the Royal Netherlands Embassy and British Council in 2002. Originally written in French, this critique was translated into English by the British Council and included in the catalogue.
There are painters that are said to be naive- often
they are great poets- they live lonely lives- they are
elegant and gracious- they hardly walk, but often in
the night they wander with their mysteries with a
fragile appearance. They owe their serenity to their
inner confidence and to unlimited belief that they
cannot fail.

These painters that are said to be naive often are
magical and majestic witnesses. They see the things
that pass unnoticed by ordinary eyes. They have the
ability to narrate wordless stories about nature and
the harmony of things gracefully. Their paintings are
songs for the evening. The truth that you see in them
will first make you smile, but then it will disturb
the most sceptical of observers. Their paintings are
too serious, or too scary, no doubt, that is why they
are compared to innocent children.

Ibiyinka must have been forged in the mould of the
spiritual Yoruba. He is a first rate poet. He is a
, a wizard. He carries his tranquillity
the same way as those who know the mysteries of the
World. His big sketches are not portraits. The
multicoloured costumes of the men standing are like
the universe which face and invite us- These big
embroidered gowns are like the firmament, they occupy
all the space when they are displayed. They are as
many dreamlike stories to bewitch us although they
come from the perfect knowledge of lost traditions-
there is an application to detail that cannot pass
unnoticed, attention to perfection in folds, colourful
arrangements, secret ornaments. These masterpieces of
great patience illustrate the peaceful and surprising
research, conducted alone by a unique artist, in the
remote region of a Nigerian Imagination.

Ibiyinka is a traveler to observe. Each time I meet
him, he is coming back from one of these imaginary
journeys. Today he is ready, he is "mature" as we say,
to carry his world of fantasy to other naive views,
other distant opinion, to talk in silence to those who
are ready to listen, the grace and magic spell of
Africa.

References

External links
 
 Ibiyinka Alao: The Smithsonian National Museum of American Art, Biographies, Ibi's Fireflies

Living people
Nigerian contemporary artists
American contemporary artists
Yoruba artists
Nigerian emigrants to the United States
1975 births
Obafemi Awolowo University alumni
Nigerian architects
Yoruba architects